In marketing, carrying cost, carrying cost of inventory or holding cost refers to the total cost of holding inventory. This includes warehousing costs such as rent, utilities and salaries, financial costs such as opportunity cost, and inventory costs related to perishability, shrinkage (leakage) and insurance. Carrying cost also includes the opportunity cost of reduced responsiveness to customers' changing requirements, slowed introduction of improved items, and the inventory's value and direct expenses, since that money could be used for other purposes. When there are no transaction costs for shipment, carrying costs are minimized when no excess inventory is held at all, as in a Just In Time production system.

Excess inventory can be held for one of three reasons. Cycle stock is held based on the re-order point, and defines the inventory that must be held for production, sale or consumption during the time between re-order and delivery. Safety stock is held to account for variability, either upstream in supplier lead time, or downstream in customer demand. Physical stock is held by consumer retailers to provide consumers with a perception of plenty. Carrying costs typically range between 20 and 30% of a company's inventory value.

Definitions
The cost consists of four different factors:
 The expenses of putting the inventory in storage
Salary and wages of workers
Maintenance in the long term
All utilities used in carrying the storage 

Moreover, the carrying cost will mostly appear as a percentage number. It provides an idea of how long the inventory could be held before the company makes a loss, which also tells the manager how much to order.

Why do companies hold inventory
Inventory is a property of a company that is ready for them to sell. There are five basic reasons that a company would need inventory.

1. Safety inventory

This would act like a buffer to make sure that the company would have excess products for sale if consumer demands exceed their expectation.

2. Cater to Cyclical and Seasonal Demand

These kind of inventory are use for predictable events that would cause a change in people's demand. For example, candy companies can start to produce extra sweets that have long duration period. Build up seasonal inventory gradually to match people's sharply increasing demand before Halloween.

3. Cycle inventory

First of all, we need to go through the idea of economic order quantity (EOQ). EOQ is an attempt to balance inventory holding or carrying costs with the costs incurred from ordering or setting up machinery. The total cost will minimized when the ordering cost and the carrying cost equal to each other. While customer order a significant quantities of products, cycle inventory would be able to save cost and act as a buffer for the company to purchase more supplies.

4. In-transit Inventory

This kind of inventory would save company a lot transportation cost and help the transition process become less time-consuming. For example, if the company request a particular raw material from overseas market. Purchase in bulk will save them a lot transportation cost from overseas shipment fees.

5. Dead Inventory

Dead inventory or dead stock is consisting of different kinds of products that was outdated or only a few consumer requests this kind of product. So manager pulled them from store shelves. 
To reduce costs of holding this kinds of products, company could hold discount events or imply price reduction to attraction consumers attentions.

Ways to reduce carrying cost
Most businesses see profit maximizing as their primary objective. In order to reach higher profit here are some methods of reducing carrying cost.

1. Base the amount of stock held on the economic situation:
The amount of stock held should be changed with consumers' demand, the situation of the industry and the exchange rate of the currency. When the economy is in recession or the currency depreciates, residents’ purchasing power would decrease.

2. Improve the layout of the warehouse:
Instead of renting a new place, the manager might consider about the idea of rearrange the layout of the warehouse that they owned. An inefficient layout may increase the risk of shipping the wrong products to consumers this would both increase transportation cost and become time-consuming. To improve the layout the company could either increase the reception area or apply segmentation. This will  reduce the cost as well as increase labour's productivity!

3. Build long-term agreements with suppliers: Signing long-term contract with suppliers may increase the supplier's financial security and the company may receive a lower price. This will become a win-win situation. Also the supplier might be willing to decrease the time period of delivery their products to the warehouse, for example from once a month to once a week. Hence, the company would be able to switch to a smaller warehouse, as they don't need to stock that much products at a time. Furthermore, this would also reduce the risks of loss and depreciation of the products.

4.  Creating an effective database:
The database should include things like retailer, date, quantity, quality, degree of advertising and the time taken until sold out. This will make sure that the future employees can learn from the past experience while making decisions. For example, if the manager want to hold a big discount event to clear the products that have been left in stock for a long time. Then he can go through the past data to find out if there is any event like this before and how was the result. The manager would be able to forecast the budget and make some improvements base on the past events’ record.

See also
 Inventory
 Inventory turnover
 Weighted average cost of capital
 Theory of constraints
 Cost accounting
 Throughput accounting

Further reading
 Applied Industrial Technologies.“Reducing Inventories and Cost of Operations While Improving Customer Support”
 REM Associates."Methodology of Calculating Inventory Carrying Costs"
 Lower inventory levels and costs due to reduction of transportation time
 Why Do Firms Hold Inventories?
 inventory
 Anupindi, Ravi, et al. Managing Business Process Flows: Principles of Operations Management. 2nd ed. Upper Saddle River, NJ: Pearson Prentice Hall, 2004.
 Cox, James F., III, and John H. Blackstone, Jr. APICS Dictionary. 9th ed. Falls Church VA: American Production and Inventory Control Society, 1998.
 Meredith, Jack R., and Scott M. Shafer. Operations Management for MBAs. 2nd ed. New York: John Wiley & Sons Inc., 2002.
 Stevenson, William J. Production/Operations Management. 8th ed. Boston: Irwin/McGraw-Hill, 2005.

References

Management cybernetics
Inventory optimization
Costs